Zličín is a Prague Metro station and terminus of Line B, located in Třebonice, Prague 17. The station was opened on 11 November 1994 as the western terminus of the extension of Line B from Nové Butovice. Zličín metro station gives direct pedestrian access to the 2004 constructed Metropole shopping mall, and has zero-fare bus links to the nearby Globus, Tesco and Ikea hypermarkets.

The station's metro lines feed into a large shed with direct rail connections to the adjacent former Siemens train and tram factory which was closed in 2009.

Zličín metro station is located next to a junction between the Prague ring road and the D5 motorway and offers direct connections with local, regional and national buses, both public transport and commercial Student Agency Express buses. The nearest Prague tram network hub is at Řepy, reached by bus lines 264 or 180 (4 stops away). Bus line 100 provides frequent connections to Ruzyně International Airport, 16 minutes away. Bus line 380 provides connections to Beroun.

References

Prague Metro stations
Railway stations opened in 1994
1994 establishments in the Czech Republic
Railway stations in the Czech Republic opened in the 20th century